Bidognetti is a surname. Notable people with the surname include:

Francesco Bidognetti (born 1951), Italian camorrista
Domenico Bidognetti, Italian crime figure

Italian-language surnames